Jade is a fictional character in the Mortal Kombat fighting game franchise by Midway Games and NetherRealm Studios. She debuted in Mortal Kombat II (1993) as a hidden opponent and first became playable in Ultimate Mortal Kombat 3 (1995). Her primary weapon is a steel bō staff.

In the story of the games, Jade is the childhood friend of Edenian princess Kitana. She first appears as an assassin for Outworld emperor Shao Kahn, but due to her friendship with Kitana, she supports the princess' rebellion against Shao Kahn to liberate the realms he conquered. Also appearing in various media outside of the games, the character has received a positive reception and is regarded as one of the franchise's strongest fighters during gameplay.

Appearances

Mortal Kombat games
In Mortal Kombat II (1993), Jade was a hidden character who played no part in the game's storyline other than appearing at the start of random fights to drop cryptic clues on how to access her. Players have to then meet particular requirements during gameplay in order to fight Jade in a secret battle in the "Goro's Lair" stage from the first game. She is wearing a green outfit similar to that of warrior princess Kitana and her evil clone Mileena, and fights with increased speed and the former's fans. Though she identifies herself in one of the clues, her energy bar was left blank in the arcade game which was included in the home versions. In Mortal Kombat: Shaolin Monks, the 2005 beat 'em up action-adventure spinoff that retold the events of MKII, she engages Shaolin warriors Liu Kang and Kung Lao in a fight alongside Mileena and a brainwashed Kitana, and loses against them.

Jade made her official debut as a playable character in Ultimate Mortal Kombat 3 (1995); an upgrade of Mortal Kombat 3), in which her backstory was expanded. She served as one of Outworld emperor Shao Kahn's elite assassins along with his adopted stepdaughter Kitana, with whom she shared a close friendship. After Kitana flees to Earthrealm after being put on trial for killing Mileena, Shao Kahn orders Jade to bring Kitana back to him alive; forcing her to choose between disobeying her superior or betraying her close friend. Shao Kahn also sends his servant Reptile along with Jade as insurance, ordering him to stop Kitana by any means necessary. When Jade and Reptile locate Kitana, the former stops the latter from assassinating her. Convinced by Reptile's actions and Kitana's words, Jade turns against the Kahn and aids Kitana in freeing her resurrected mother, Queen Sindel, from Shao Kahn's mind control. The three join up with Kitana's Earthrealm allies to defeat Shao Kahn, and after they liberate Edenia from Outworld, Jade serves Sindel and Kitana for years. Jade's UMK3 backstory, along with those of Kitana and Reptile, remains unchanged in Mortal Kombat Trilogy (1996).

Jade returned as a playable character in Mortal Kombat: Deception (2004) following an extended absence from the series. She witnesses the deaths of Kitana and the thunder god Raiden's chosen fighters at the hands of the Deadly Alliance of sorcerers Shang Tsung and Quan Chi and their subsequent resurrection by the Dragon King Onaga. Jade is forced to imprison a brainwashed Kitana in the Edenian palace dungeon before freeing Sindel and escaping with her to Outworld, all while seeking revenge against traitorous fellow Edenian Tanya, who had allied herself with Onaga. In Sindel's non-canonical ending, she and Jade locate Onaga's tomb when he sends Kitana after them. Jade battles her friend before Sindel kills Onaga, breaking Kitana from his spell and returning peace to Edenia. Jade's own non-canonical game ending makes no mention of Kitana or Sindel, which instead depicts her confronting Tanya, the mutant Baraka, and a group of Tarkatan warriors. In the game's Konquest mode, Jade orders the warrior Shujinko to apprehend another Edenian traitor, Rain, and bring him to her.

Jade makes non-playable appearances in the 2005 beat 'em up spin-off title Mortal Kombat: Shaolin Monks.

In Mortal Kombat, the 2011 reboot of the series, Jade was born into Edenian royalty that served Shao Kahn after he conquered the realm. After years of rigorous training and service as an Outworld assassin, Jade earned a reputation as an agile and stealthy warrior. She was awarded the position of bodyguard to Princess Kitana and the two became close friends, but similar to her UMK3 storyline, Jade was under orders to kill Kitana should she become disloyal to the Kahn. Jade features in a chapter in the game's story mode, in which her self-assured and sassy personality stands in contrast to Kitana, who struggles to fulfill Shao Kahn's expectations and begins doubting her origins. They initially fight against the Earthrealm warriors, but Jade soon becomes suspicious of Kitana when she attempts to discover her true heritage, which in turn leads to her capture when she confronts Shao Kahn after coming across a grotesque clone of herself named Mileena. Jade changes allegiances and helps the Earthrealm warriors free Kitana from captivity. She later joins them as they prepare to fend off Shao Kahn's invasion of Earthrealm. As Raiden and Liu Kang commune with the Elder Gods, the Lin Kuei ninja clan and Sindel attack; killing Jade and her allies before they are resurrected as undead revenants and enslaved in the Netherealm by Quan Chi.

Jade was officially omitted from Mortal Kombat X in 2015, with game director Ed Boon announcing the news on Twitter and NetherRealm Studios doing the same during a live stream promoting the game. Kitana was instead shown using Jade's weapons in one of her three gameplay variations. She is neither seen nor mentioned in the game's story mode, but makes a cameo appearance in Kitana's ending. "Assassin Jade" was later added to the mobile version of MKX (Update 1.13 in 2017) and her second skin, "Day of the Dead", was added in a later update (Update 1.21 in 2018).

Jade's revenant returns in Mortal Kombat 11 (2019), serving Kitana and Liu Kang's revenants in the Netherrealm after they became its new rulers in MKX as well as servant to the keeper of time Kronika. Due to her plans to erase Raiden from history however, a time anomaly she created inadvertently brought past versions of Jade and Kitana to the present. The two lent their support to its new ruler Kotal Kahn, with whom Jade shared a romantic history with before she died. While helping him track down a time-displaced Shao Kahn, during which they encountered Jade's revenant, Kotal's hatred for all Tarkatans led Jade to beat him down before he killed innocent Tarkatans and left them both vulnerable to being captured by their quarry. She is later rescued by Kitana and joins her united Outworld army in confronting Shao Kahn. After Kitana becomes the new Kahn of Outworld, she and Jade take part in the final battle against Kronika and their revenant counterparts alongside the combined Earthrealm/Outworld armies.

Design

Jade debuted in Mortal Kombat II as a green palette swap of Kitana with darker skin and gold-tinted duplicates of her steel fans. Ed Boon said she was initially just "an evil version of Kitana, in a sense." While the game was in development, the team wanted to add a secret character based on Katalin Zamiar, who had already been filmed performing as Kitana and Mileena; Jade was created in what Zamiar described as a mostly "on the spot" fashion. Zamiar's outfit used for filming the female ninja characters was blue, and presented some challenges for the actress during filming, such as the bottoms of the leggings being a bit too slippery for moves such as jump kicks and the tops having to be held up with rubber bands, while her mask was taped to her nose to keep it in place. Zamiar did not return for Ultimate Mortal Kombat 3 due to brewing legal issues with Midway, and was replaced by Becky Gable. At that point, Jade was given a staff weapon to further separate her from Kitana and Mileena. In UMK3 and subsequent titles where the three of them appear, while Mileena's skin color is sometimes mildly darker than Kitana's, Jade's skin is consistently the darkest of the three. In the 2011 reboot game, Jade can have classic palette-swapped outfits from the 1990s as some of her alternate costumes; there is even a secret special encounter battle against her wielding Kitana's fans just like in Mortal Kombat II.

Like their male ninja counterparts in the Mortal Kombat games, Kitana, Mileena and Jade evolved considerably from their original palette swaps in the three-dimensional titles, receiving distinct new designs and other features. John Vogel, who worked on story and animations for Deception, said "the approach we've taken for Jade in this game is that she's more of stealthy ninja type of character. She's the one who sneaks around and gets information, and carries out covert activities." For Mortal Kombat X, from which Jade was initially excluded, her special attacks were given to Kitana for her "Mournful" gameplay variation, described in the game as Kitana paying tribute to "her fallen best friend" by "employing the weapons of the deceased master assassin."

Gameplay
In Mortal Kombat II, Jade (described therein as "an undiscovered warrior from Mortal Kombat One") used Kitana's weapons, in particular her "Fan Throw", but was extremely fast and immune to projectile attacks. With her Ultimate Mortal Kombat 3 debut, Jade's primary weapon became a magical steel bō staff (changed to a spear only for Deception and additionally telescopic in MK2011), which was also used in her Fatalities, mostly for impaling her opponents. Her projectile attack in the game was a three-pronged boomerang that players could shoot in three different forward directions through varying joystick and button combinations. Jade's body-propel attack, a kick that sees her encased in a smoking green glow, is a variant of Johnny Cage's Shadow Kick. Sega Saturn Magazine's guide to Ultimate Mortal Kombat 3 described her specials as leading into "some devastating combo attacks," adding that she was especially hard to win against as the CPU-controlled opponent.

Jade's moves, along with these of Mileena and Kitana, were used in Mortal Kombat Trilogy to create the hidden composite character Khameleon. In their 1997 review of the game, GameSpot described both Jade and Noob Saibot in Trilogy as being "incredibly overpowered, with moves that run from rendering projectiles ineffective to making characters momentarily powerless." According to Total 64, "with a wealth of special moves, some bloody death moves and some easy combos, Jade is the hardest bird on the block." She was a non-playable boss character in Shaolin Monks, fighting alongside both Kitana and Mileena. Prima Games rated Jade an overall score of seven out of ten, higher than Kitana and Mileena, for the 2006 compilation title Mortal Kombat: Armageddon, in which she was playable along with the entire Mortal Kombat roster. For the 2011 reboot, Prima opined that her "speed, safe attacks, and savvy combo abilities put her near the top of the cast."

Other media
She has a minor role in Martin Delrio's novelization of the 1995 live-action film Mortal Kombat, based in part on the film's early scripts by Kevin Droney, in which she duels Sonya Blade in a bout that was omitted from the film. Jade is killed with a single kick to the head by Sonya after being tricked into returning Sonya's bow of respect.

Jade is a supporting character in the 1997 film Mortal Kombat: Annihilation, and was portrayed by Siberian-born supermodel and actress Irina Pantaeva in the role of "a beautiful refugee from Outworld." She first appears before Liu Kang wearing a fur cloak over a revealing cloth outfit, after he awakens from a dream state induced by Nightwolf, who had been training him earlier. In her only fight scene, she attacks Liu Kang when he rejects her advances (the film's special features explain she "develops a burning desire to have Liu love her"), before which she magically changes to her familiar green costume. Her staff is instead a spear. Jade has no past relationship nor any interaction with Kitana in the film, and she secretly remains loyal to Shao Kahn while pretending to aid the Earthrealm warriors in her attempt to lead them into an ambush. When this fails, Shao Kahn has her eaten alive by a gargoyle in his palace. Pantaeva, making her English-language film debut while having no martial arts experience, underwent six months' training prior to shooting "so that my character would grow into a powerful and sexy warrior." The fight scene was shot in Thailand in a single take, and Pantaeva had enjoyed the experience to the extent that she successfully asked Annihilation director John R. Leonetti to do a second take.

Jade's role in Jerome Preisler's novelization of Annihilation, based in part on the screenplays by Brent V. Friedman and Bryce Zabel, differs little from her onscreen role as she attempts to seduce Liu Kang (there is no fight between them in this version) and later lures the Earthrealm warriors into a trap, but was additionally revealed to be Kitana's former lover, during which she makes mention of her Edenian heritage. She is still put to death by the enraged Shao Kahn for her failure in ambushing the Earth warriors; Kahn first strangles her and then feeds her to a living stained glass window monster.

She is a recurring guest character in the Mortal Kombat series published by Malibu Comics, first in the 1995 miniseries Battlewave, in which she is simply an evil assassin serving Shao Kahn and had no connection to Kitana, instead being paired regularly with fellow Mortal Kombat II hidden character Smoke. She is identical to Kitana only in that she is brunette and employed a pair of steel fans, while her green palette was unchanged; her eyes are variably drawn with and without lens. Jade and Smoke unsuccessfully attempt to assassinate Jax in a hospital and Johnny Cage aboard a plane headed to Outworld, and also Liu Kang in Outworld. In the finale of the 1995 three-issue miniseries Rayden and Kano, she and Smoke try to redeem themselves by killing Raiden, but again fail.

Jade was slated to make a single-episode appearance in the 1996 animated series Mortal Kombat: Defenders of the Realm. Threshold Entertainment, the series' producers, had published a guide for its writers prior to production that contained brief biographies of series characters shortlisted for inclusion in the show. Jade's role in the guide was that of "a childhood friend of Kitana's but also works for [Shao] Kahn at times. She is alluring, mysterious and exotic, yet she cannot be trusted. She use[s] her beauty to lure her unsuspecting prey." However, Jade was ultimately converted by Threshold into an original character renamed Ruby.

Jade appears in the sequel Mortal Kombat Legends: Battle of the Realms, voiced by Emily O'Brien.

Merchandise and promotion
A computer-generated Jade "hosted" G4's 2005 digital beauty pageant Girls Gone Wired, in which she declared her superiority over Pamela Anderson. In 2011, a Jade costume download for the PlayStation 3 version of the 2011 Mortal Kombat reboot game was included in separate Blu-ray releases of the two feature films. Jade and Kitana were the only characters in the reboot to have two "Klassic" costumes—their MKII (in which Jade has her staff) and UMK3 outfits—available for download. Model and cosplayer Evgeniya Rukavitsina dressed up as Jade in print advertising for the 2012 Russian release of the PlayStation Vita port of the reboot game.

Two different Jade action figures (basic and 10-inch models, each with different featured weapons) were released by Toy Island in 1996 as part of their Mortal Kombat Trilogy line. A Jade figurine was included with a 1995 special issue of Argentinian magazine Top Kids that featured a cover story titled "Jade: mystery warrior." She was included with the MKII cast in the 1994 Mortal Kombat Kard Game produced by BradyGames as a common character, and in the 2004 Epic Battles card game, which featured the Mortal Kombat: Deception roster, as one of the "rare" characters. A 1:6 scale limited-edition statue of Jade from MK2011 was released in the Mortal Kombat "Enchanted Warriors" line by Syco Collectibles in 2012, and a "Klassic" UMK3 1:4 scale statue of Jade was released by Pop Culture Shock Collectibles in 2014.

Reception
The character has received a mostly positive critical reception. Game Players listed her among "MKII'''s best characters" as compared to "the less interesting MK3 characters."

UGO ranked Jade 21st in their 2012 listing of the top fifty Mortal Kombat characters. She topped the Mortal Kombat category of the "Miss of Video Games 2012" award by Polish console magazine PSX Extreme, while placing thirteenth overall. However, she was ranked 59th in Den of Geek's 2015 rating of the franchise's 73 player characters for what they perceived as her lack of depth. "Jade gets to show up in modern games because she was in Mortal Kombat II, but she doesn't really bring anything to the table."

According to UGO's Chris Plante, "Jade [seems] to fetishize Eastern culture. Her skin tone is darker than similarly-dressed characters Kitana and Mileena, who are her aristocratic superiors. She is paradox: equal parts, exotic slave girl, her most powerful weapon being her sexuality. She's the mystical, foreign  widow, a relic of postwar pulp novels." While comparing the Mortal Kombat characters to the seven deadly sins in Dante's Inferno, GamePro chose Jade to represent Lust. Jade placed third out of five in the "Sexiest Finish" category of G4TV's 2005 Video Game Vixens pageant, and was included among the "hottest chicks of 2011" by Univision. Complex ranked her as number one in their 2011 list of the "best looking sideline chicks in games," declaring a preference for her over Kitana, Mileena and Sonya. "No one should be so lethal with a stripper pole (okay, we meant staff), but she's capable of doing amazing things with it." Jade was ranked as the 30th-best looking game girl by GameHall's Portal PlayGame in 2014, while her breasts were ranked as the third-finest in video games by GameFront's Ross Lincoln in 2011, and seventh-best by Drea Avellan of Complex in 2012. Jade, Mileena and Kitana were all included among the top ten "hottest female villains in gaming" by Travis Huber of Cheat Code Central in 2014: "I am calling these characters the trifecta of terror. Or maybe the trifecta of T&A."

GameFront's Phil Owen noted her popularity among the more attractive cosplayers, as did the staffs of Heavy.com and TF1. Fitness model Alicia Marie dressed up as Jade for the 2013 Comic-Con alongside Adrianne Curry as Mileena. Dressed as Jade, Paris Sinclair participated in a photo session with Jessica Nigri dressed as Sonya. Conversely, however, some criticized what was perceived as oversexualization of the character, with io9 including a Jade costume among 2011's "sluttiest and weirdest" store-bought Halloween dress-ups. Jade and Kitana represented the "women who fight" trope in Chad Hunter's 2012 Complex list of the fifteen most stereotypical characters in video games, as embodying "half-naked skanks who can fight, hurl lasers and perform aerobatic attacks while wearing thongs, high-heeled boots and keeping their giant breasts under scarves."

Jade's "Head Gymnastics" Fatality from Mortal Kombat: Deception has been received positively, for instance placing 33rd in Prima Games' 2014 ranking of the series' top fifty Fatalities. Previously, Game Informer included it in their 2010 selection of the series' best finishers. Adam Dodd of Cheat Code Central ranked it sixth in his list of the series' top ten finishers, stating: "This fatality is brutal, stylish, and includes a little showmanship, and that's essentially everything a fatality needs to be."

Jade's appearance in Mortal Kombat: Annihilation, like many of the film's cast of characters, was not well received. James Deaux of Earth-2 opined, "[She] served only one purpose in this movie: to be the seductive harpy who pretends to assist Liu Kang but is really there to stall, confuse, grope and otherwise wound him." Doug Skiles of Killer Movies wrote in his 1997 review of the film, "Who honestly cares about the woman that shows up calling herself Jade?"

In 2010, Jade was included by Game Informer among the series' unwanted "palette swap characters," excluding Scorpion and Sub-Zero, for omission from future Mortal Kombat installments. However, according to Ed Boon himself, "even with Kitana's mournful variation, Jade is the most missed female fighter in Mortal Kombat X" by fans, as evidenced by the results of a poll he had posted on Twitter. Previously, Mortal Kombat X'' producer Shaun Himmerick had quit his social media presence following a string of violent threats issued towards him and his family after announcing Jade's removal from the game on a stream.

Notes

References

External links

Action film characters
Action film villains
Black characters in video games
Extraterrestrial characters in video games
Female characters in video games
Female film villains
Female video game villains
Fictional Fanzi practitioners
Fictional assassins in video games
Fictional blade and dart throwers
Fictional bodyguards in video games
Fictional bojutsuka
Fictional characters with post-traumatic stress disorder
Fictional martial artists in video games
Fictional female martial artists
Fictional female ninja
Fictional tessenjutsuka
Ghost characters in video games
Mortal Kombat characters
Ninja characters in video games
Video game bosses
Video game characters introduced in 1993
Video game characters who can teleport
Nobility characters in video games
Video game protagonists
Woman soldier and warrior characters in video games
Zombie and revenant characters in video games